was a Japanese digital audio pioneer, who led Sony's Compact Disc project in the 1970s.

Born in Kurume, Fukuoka Prefecture, Nakajima graduated from the Tokyo Institute of Technology with a bachelor's degree in electrical engineering in 1944, and earned a Doctor of Engineering degree from Kyushu University in 1958.

In 1971, Nakajima joined Sony as a managing director, hired by Sony's co-founder and president at large, Masaru Ibuka. He became president of Aiwa in 1984. In 1989, he received the first IEEE Masaru Ibuka Consumer Electronics Award and in 1993 he was awarded the Purple Ribbon Medal for CD development.

References

1921 births
2017 deaths
Japanese electrical engineers
Kyushu University alumni
Recipients of the Medal with Purple Ribbon
Sony people
Tokyo Institute of Technology alumni